Re Barlow's Will Trusts [1979] 1 WLR 278 is an English trusts law case, concerning certainty of the words "family" and "friends" in a will.

Facts
Miss Helen Alice Dorothy Barlow, the testatrix had a large collection of pictures. She specifically bequeathed some. For the remainder, she declared them to be held by her executor on trust to sell them, but that her ‘family and friends’ could buy them first at 1970 valuations or at the probate value, whichever was lower. The proceeds would go to the residuary estate. The executors asked the court whether the direction about family and friends was void, given its uncertainty, and if it was valid, who the family and friends were.

Judgment
Browne-Wilkinson J held that the trust was valid, because both concepts of friends and family could be given a workable meaning.  Although ‘friend’ could have a wide variety of meaning, the minimum requirements were that (a) the relationship had to be long standing (b) be a social and not a business or professional relationship, and (c) although they may not have met for some time, when circumstances allowed, they would meet frequently. The word ‘family’ could be construed as any ‘blood relation’, and the only reason in other cases to restrict the concept to statutory next of kin had been to save gifts from failing for uncertainty.

See also

English trusts law
Sir Thomas Barlow, 1st Baronet, Helen Barlow's father

Notes

References

English trusts case law
High Court of Justice cases
1979 in case law
1979 in British law